The Hawaii Department of Transportation (HDOT) is a state government organization which oversees transportation in the U.S. state of Hawaii. The agency is divided into three divisions dealing with aviation, maritime, and roads.

HDOT Divisions

Airports Division
The HDOT Airports Division operates all the public airports throughout the state including Daniel K. Inouye International Airport. The Division is divided into offices, branches and divisions to provide services based on location or specialization.
 Airports Administrator - oversees all state owned airports
 Staff Services Office - provides administrative support
 Visitor Information Program Office - manages the state Visitor Information Program in coordination with other HDOT divisions
 Information Technology Office - provides information technology support
 Airports Operations Office - provides operational support including firefighting at state owned airports
 Engineering Branch - provides engineering support
 Oahu District - maintains airports on the island of Oahu
 Maui District - maintains airports on the island of Maui
 Hawaii District - maintains airports on the island of Hawaii
 Kauai District - maintains airports on the island of Kauai

Airports maintained by HDOT Airports Division
 Kalaeloa Airport (JRF)
 Dillingham Airfield (HDH)
 Honolulu International Airport (HNL)
 Hana Airport (HNM)
 Hilo International Airport (ITO)
 Kalaupapa Airport (LUP)
 Lanai Airport (LNY)
 Lihue Airport (LIH)
 Kahului Airport (OGG)
 Kona International Airport at Keahole (KOA)
 Upolu Airport (UPP)
 Molokai Airport (MKK)
 Kapalua Airport (JHM)
 Waimea-Kohala Airport (MUE)
 Port Allen Airport (PAK)

Harbors Division
On July 1, 1961, the functions, duties and powers of the Board of Harbor Commissioners of the Territory of Hawaii were transferred to the state Department of Transportation.  The HDOT Harbors Division operates ten commercial harbors throughout the state. The division is self-sufficient, with the majority of its income coming from various harbor and wharf rental fees.

Commercial Harbors operated by HDOT Harbors Division

The HDOT Harbors Division operates ten commercial harbors throughout the state. The division is self-sufficient, with the majority of its income coming from various harbor and wharf rental fees.

 Honolulu Harbor
 Kalaeloa - Barbers Point Harbor
 Kahalui Harbor
 Hana Harbor
 Hilo Harbor
 Kawaihae Harbor
 Nawiliwili Harbor
 Port Allen Harbor
 Kaunakakai Harbor
 Kaumalapau Harbor

Highways Division
The HDOT Highways Division maintains the state highway system.

See also

 Hawaii Harbor Police
 Kona Airport Police

References

External links
 Official website

State departments of transportation of the United States
Transportation in Hawaii
State agencies of Hawaii
1959 establishments in Hawaii
Government agencies established in 1959